80 Days is a video game developed by Frogwares released in 2005 for Windows, based on the 1873 Jules Verne novel Around the World in Eighty Days.

Gameplay
The game is a typical adventure game. The player must collect objects and go to particular locations to reach the next objective. However, there are 3 limitations: Time, Money and Fatigue. The latter may be ignored using means of transport and can be restored by eating food.

Plot
Matthew Lavisheart is a proud gentleman and engineer. He makes a bet, showing that he took part at inventing the most important gadgets at the time by delivering the documents that approve this in maximum 80 days. The problem is that these documents are scattered, in four of the most important cities of the world: Cairo, Bombay, Yokohama and San Francisco.

Matthew begs his nephew, Oliver, to get these documents for him. Oliver accepts, as he wants to escape a marriage that his parents want. And so, Oliver leaves for Cairo.

Reception

80 Days received "mixed" reviews according to the review aggregation website Metacritic. PC Gamer US gave it 61% nearly a year after the game was released in the United States.

References

External links
 Official website (archived)
 

2005 video games
Adventure games
Focus Entertainment games
Mumbai in fiction
Single-player video games
Video games based on works by Jules Verne
Video games developed in Ukraine
Video games set in Egypt
Video games set in India
Video games set in Japan
Video games set in the United States
Video games set in the 19th century
Windows games
Windows-only games
Works based on Around the World in Eighty Days
Tri Synergy games
Frogwares games